Pacific Station is an American sitcom television series starring Robert Guillaume and Richard Libertini that aired on NBC from September 15, 1991 to January 3, 1992. The series was created by the team of Barry Fanaro, Mort Nathan, Kathy Speer and Terry Grossman.

Synopsis
Pacific Station centered around Detective Bob Ballard (Robert Guillaume), a wisecracking veteran cop who had been assigned to Pacific Station in Venice, California, apparently usually a dumping ground for eccentric and/or incompetent officers. Even more eccentric were the suspects the officers of Pacific Station brought in, as many were from nearby Venice Beach, a celebratedly off-center locale.  The other officers of Pacific Station included Detective Richard Capparelli (Richard Libertini), fresh from treatment for his psychological problems, Detective Sandy Calloway (Megan Gallagher), and the brown-nosing Detective Al Burkhardt (Ron Leibman). In command of this hodgepodge was the recently promoted, immature, mother-fixated Captain Ken Epstein (Joel Murray), who had received the place which logic dictated should have gone to Bob. Frequently blustering his way through the station was Deputy Commissioner Hank Bishop (John Hancock), who never let anyone forget for a moment that he was a deputy commissioner.

Richard Libertini had just recently worked with creators/producers Fanaro, Nathan, Speer and Grossman on NBC's The Fanelli Boys the previous season.

Cast
Robert Guillaume as Det. Bob Ballard
Richard Libertini as Det. Richard Capparelli
Megan Gallagher as Det. Sandy Calloway
Ron Leibman as Det. Al Burkhardt
Joel Murray as Capt. Ken Epstein
John Hancock as Dep. Commissioner Hank Bishop

Scheduling
Pacific Station did not garner solid ratings, due to competition from ABC's America's Funniest People and CBS's Murder, She Wrote. It was put on hiatus in October 1991. Brought back in a new time slot in December, it was permanently cancelled in January 1992.

Title Sequence
The opening theme for Pacific Station was an in-house cover of Fontella Bass' "Rescue Me". The sequence began with shots of Venice Beach attractions, followed by the view of a police truck driving into the parking lot of the station as the title appeared on-screen. This proceeded into more videotaped scenes of the show and cast.

Episodes

References

External links

1991 American television series debuts
1992 American television series endings
1990s American sitcoms
1990s American police comedy television series
NBC original programming
Television series by ABC Studios
Television shows set in Los Angeles
English-language television shows